This is a list of notable American public address announcers.

Baseball 
Major League Baseball - Current Public Address Announcers
 Michael Araujo - Los Angeles Angels
 Dan Baker – Philadelphia Phillies
 Renel Brooks-Moon – San Francisco Giants
 Marysol Castro – First Woman Announcer for New York Mets, First Latina Woman Announcer in Major League Baseball
 Colin Cosell – New York Mets, Emmy-winning grandson of Howard Cosell
 Bob Ford – Houston Astros, University of Houston football
 Gene Honda – Chicago White Sox, Chicago Blackhawks, DePaul University, NCAA Final Four, and Chicago PBS WTTW
 Tom Hutyler – Seattle Mariners
 Jerome Hruska - Washington  Nationals
 Todd Leitz – Los Angeles Dodgers
 Chuck Morgan - Texas Rangers, Kansas City Royals As of September 27, 2020, has announced 3,001 consecutive Major League games.
 Paul Olden – New York Yankees
 Bob Tayek - Cleveland Guardians
 Tim Debacco - Pittsburgh Pirates

Major League Baseball - Former Public Address Announcers
 Alex Anthony – New York Jets and New York Mets
 Pete Arbogast – Los Angeles Dodgers
 Rex Barney – Baltimore Orioles
 Carl Beane – Boston Red Sox
 Bruce Binkowski – San Diego Chargers, San Diego Clippers, San Diego Padres, and San Diego State Aztecs
 Charlie Brotman – U.S. presidential inauguration parades, Washington Senators, Washington Nationals
Cody Ray Desbiens - At age 18 in 2013, the youngest individual to ever PA announce a full Major League Baseball game - Fenway Park 
Aaron "AC" Larkin - Arizona State University, Grand Canyon University, Sheboygan County Rebels, Goodyear Ballpark
 Frederick William Burns – Earliest known announcer dating to 1884, New York Giants, Track and Field, Bicycle Racing, Automobile Racing, Boxing, Rowing
 Dick Callahan – Oakland Athletics, and Saint Mary's College of California
 Mike Carlucci - Los Angeles Dodgers, Anaheim Ducks, Los Angeles Kings and '02,'04,'06,'08,'16,'18,'20,'22 Winter & Summer Olympics, 2018 FIFA World Cup
 Bob Casey – Minnesota Twins
 Joe Collier - First Public Address Announcer of Color for the Dodge Brothers Baseball Club in California. Also, a professional boxer.
 Kevin Croft - USSSA Men’s Major World Series of Slow Pitch Softball, 1994 - present
 J. Fred Duckett – Houston Astros
 Sherm Feller – Boston Red Sox
 Paul Friedman – Chicago Cubs
 Halsey Hall – Minnesota Twins
 Jim Hall – New York Giants football team, New York Yankees
 Joe Hawk -- Oakland Athletics First six games of 1996 season against Blue Jays and Tigers at Las Vegas' Cashman Field when Athletics' home facility was undergoing renovations; first openly gay P.A. announcer in major league history
 Wilfred "Wolfie" Jacobs – Early Boston Red Sox announcer at Fenway Park, 1st to announce rookie Babe Ruth, worked for Boston Red Sox for 50 years
 "Admiral" M. J. Kingston – 1st announcer of the Chicago Cubs who lost his job to Pat Pieper
 Sherman Maxwell - known as "Jocko". 1st Sports Commentator of color. Also, PA announcer for the Newark Eagles of Negro league baseball.
 Joy Hawkins McCabe – 1st Woman Baseball Announcer, Washington Senators, subbing one single game for Charlie Brotman in 1966
 Wayne Messmer – Chicago Cubs
 Joel Meyers – St. Louis Cardinals
 Josh Miller – San Francisco Giants Spring Training, Grand Canyon University baseball, Major League Baseball's Arizona Fall League
 Nick Nickson – Los Angeles Dodgers
 E. Lawrence Phillips – Washington Senators, Earliest known World Series announcer for the 1911 World Series, Known as "One-Armed Announcer" as he had no left arm
 Sherry O'Brien - Philadelphia Phillies - Shibe Park - Changed baseball announcing forever in 1944 by announcing each batter to the plate. Prior to this, the lineups were announced pre-game. Announced auto racing as well.
 Pat Pieper – Chicago Cubs
 Ryan Pritt – Cleveland Guardians
 John Ramsey – Los Angeles Dodgers, Los Angeles Kings, Los Angeles Lakers, Los Angeles Rams, Los Angeles Angels, USC Trojans
 John “Tex” Rickards – Brooklyn Dodgers announcer replaced by John Ramsey when the team moved to Los Angeles.
 Harry Safir - New York Giants, Earliest announcer of the New York Yankees in 1903, His primary job was caterer at the Polo Grounds
 Stu Schwartz (aka Stuntman Stu) – Ottawa Senators
 Bob Sheppard – New York Yankees, New York Giants
 Carole Stuart - Female stadium announcer in professional baseball (minor leagues) for the Reno Silver Sox, 1972 season
 Sherry Davis - San Francisco Giants - 1st Full Time Female Public Address Announcer in Professional Baseball History. 1993-2000
 Mary Morisoli - Salinas Packers (Class C Affiliate of Milwaukee Braves) 1956 - 1st Full Time Female in Professional Baseball. California League
 Daune Robinson - Woman PA Announcer for Cleveland Indians - 1998-2007
 Leslie Sterling - Woman PA Announcer for the Boston Red Sox 1994-1996 - 1st Woman of Color

Basketball 
 Michael Baiamonte – Miami Heat
 Michael Clapper – Washington Mystics
 Ray Clay – Chicago Bulls Chicago Sky
 Byron Hudtloff – Washington Valor, George Washington University Men's Basketball
 Frank Fallon – NCAA Men's Division I Basketball Championship
 John Mason – Detroit Pistons
 Vince Marotta – Phoenix Suns
 Ralph Wesley – Washington Wizards
 Lawrence Tanter – Los Angeles Lakers
 Matt Cord – Philadelphia 76ers
 Andy Jick – Boston Celtics, Boston College
 Stan Kelly – San Antonio Spurs
 Eddie Palladino – Boston Celtics
 Jedidiah Jones – Minnesota Timberwolves
 Olivier Sedra – Brooklyn Nets
 Mike Walczewski – New York Knicks
 Dan Roberts – Utah Jazz
 Sean Heath - Dallas Mavericks
 Jaime Coffee - Sacramento Kings - 1st Female to Announce an NBA Game, January 29, 2014
•   Sean Peebles- Cleveland Cavaliers

Boxing/Wrestling 
 Michael Buffer – Boxing
 Tony Chimel – World Wrestling Entertainment
 David Diamante – boxing
 Johnny Parnell Dunne – Boxing, Self-proclaimed "Champion Announcer of the World" in the late 19th century, famous for continually challenging Fred Burns, Pete Prunty, Charles Harvey and Joe Humphries to announcing contests which never occurred
 Howard Finkel – World Wrestling Entertainment
 Lilian Garcia – World Wrestling Entertainment
 Charles "Handlebar Charley" Harvey – Boxing, Track and Field, Announcer for [[World%27s Columbian Exposition]|1893 Chicago World's Fair]], Boxing manager, promoter, secretary and commissioner, vanguard in getting Boxing included in modern Olympic Games
 Joe Humphreys – Boxing, member of the Boxing Hall of Fame
 Peter Prunty – Boxing, Track and Field, part of the original group of Fred Burns, John Dunne, Charley Harvey and Joe Humphries at the turn of the 20th century.
 Jimmy Lennon, Jr. – boxing
 Justin Roberts – All Elite Wrestling, formerly of World Wrestling Entertainment
 Belle W. Martell – Earliest known Woman Announcer, Boxing, she and her husband, Art, managed Jim Jeffries's famed Jeffries Red Barn fight venue.

Football 
National Football League
 Chico Renfroe - 1st Known African-American PA Announcer in the National Football League for the Atlanta Falcons, late 1970s
 Jeff K – Dallas Cowboys
 Matt Rogers – Tennessee Titans
 Roger Emrich - Dallas Cowboys
 Sam Lagana – Los Angeles Rams
 John Rooke - New England Patriots
 John Magrino – Tampa Bay Buccaneers, NFL International Series, College Football Playoff National Championship, Orange Bowl, Outback Bowl
Larry Richert- Pittsburgh Steelers
 Carrie Romero - 1st known Female to Announce at an NFL game in any capacity. Tennessee Titans player introductions in 2021.

Other Football Announcers
 Mike Collins - Notre Dame Football
 Kevin Heilbronner – Greensboro Swarm
 Wendy Herm - Princeton Tigers Football, Basketball, Soccer. 1st Female to Announce NCAA or higher football game September 27, 1997 Fordham at Princeton. 1st Female to Announce football in an NFL Stadium. Giants Stadium, Yale at Princeton, November 15, 1997
 Dave McHugh – Baltimore Brigade
 Kate Scott - 1st Female to Announce NCAA Division I-A (FBS) Football Game with the Pac-12 Football Championship Game
 Sean Valley - Inglemoor Vikings, prev Lake Washington, Bothell, Redmond.

Horse racing 
 Jack Adler - 1st known horse racing announcer - late 1880s - famous for saying "All Right..." before announcing all race results.
Chic Anderson – horse racing (best known for work at Belmont Park)
 Sergeant Major Michael R. Dudley – United States Presidential Inaugural Swearing-in Ceremonies, Department of Defense, Military District of Washington, The United States Army Band (Pershing's Own), Boston Pops Orchestra
 Tom Durkin – horse racing
 Phil Georgeff – horse racing
 Dave Johnson – horse racing

Ice Hockey 
 Erich Freiny – Detroit Red Wings
 Lou Nolan – Philadelphia Flyers
 Mike Ross – Toronto Maple Leafs
 William Watson – IIHF, MLRH – Ice and Inline hockey.
 Joe Wowk – Lehigh Valley Phantoms
 Wes Johnson – Washington Capitals
 Wade Minter - Carolina Hurricanes
 Andrew Imber - Florida Panthers
 Ryan Mill - Pittsburgh Penguins
 Jeff K - Dallas Stars
 Paul McCann - Nashville Predators
 Alan Roach - Colorado Avalanche
 Al Murdoch - Vancouver Canucks
 Tom Calhoun - St. Louis Blues
 Phil Hulett - Anaheim Ducks
 Sari Zalesin - Dallas Stars - 1st Full-Time Female Announcer in Professional Hockey/1st Female to Announce a Major Sports Playoff Game
 Jake Zimmer - Boston Bruins - 2022-present
 John Dolan - Boston Bruins alternate since 2005
 Ann Craig-Cinnamon - Indianapolis Ice - 1st Female Public Address Announcer in a professional hockey game in 1989
 Jarrod Wronski - Hershey Bears

Mixed 
 Tom Carnegie – Indianapolis Motor Speedway, Indiana high school basketball
 Charles "Chuck" Edwards – New Orleans Saints, New Orleans Pelicans
 Greg Gardner - WNBA Chicago Sky, University of Illinois - Chicago Basketball and Volleyball, Illinois High School Association State Finals - Volleyball, Gymnastics, Lacrosse
 Marty Glickman – (sports announcer)
 Dwight Isenhoward - Winston Salem Dash, Catawba Indians, Elkin Buckin Elks
 Bob Jenkins - Indianapolis Motor Speedway
 Patrick Lagreid - Phoenix Mercury, Arizona Rattlers, Salt River Fields at Talking Stick
 Chuck Morris - University of Tennessee baseball; 2015 Special Olympics World Games, basketball.
 Bill Melton - Dallas Cowboys, Super Bowls VI, VIII and IX;  1996 Olympic Soccer; Texas Rangers; Cotton Bowl Classic; Texas Relays; NCAA Track and Field and Basketball Championships, SMU Football and Basketball; 1994 Men's World Cup Soccer; 2003 Women's World Cup Soccer; 2002 FIBA World Basketball Championships;  World Championship Tennis, Dallas Chaparrals Basketball; 2001 and 2005 Presidential Inaugural Parade and Ceremonies
 Dan Pfeifer - Alverno Inferno, Marquette University Men's and Women's Soccer, Lakeshore Chinooks, Racine Raiders
 Brian Nash - George Mason Baseball, Basketball, Volleyball, also Marquette University 
 Alan Roach – Colorado Avalanche, Colorado Rapids, Minnesota Vikings, Super Bowl, Pro Bowl, NFL International Series, Olympic Hockey, Olympic Boxing, former PA Announcer of the Denver Broncos
 Jeff Shreve – Cleveland Browns – University of Akron, Canton Charge, Mid-American Conference
 Eric Smith – Los Angeles Clippers, Los Angeles Chargers, Los Angeles Dodgers
 Don Wadewitz - Milwaukee Area Technical College Stormers, UW-Whitewater Warhawks
 Mike Mahnke - University of Wisconsin Football, Men's Basketball, Men's Hockey, Women's Basketball and Volleyball. WIAA State Basketball Tournaments. Milwaukee Brewers baseball (guest PA announcer, 1998)
 Jake Zimmer - Voice of Premier Lacrosse League, 2021-present

References

Sports occupations and roles